"Wish You Were Mine" is the debut single by English producer Philip George. It samples the Stevie Wonder song "My Cherie Amour". It was released on 28 December 2014 as a digital download in the United Kingdom through 3 Beat Productions. The song peaked at number 2 on the UK Singles Chart, remaining there for three consecutive weeks. It was going to be released in 2008 but got cancelled. It was sampled in MC Pat Flynn's “Get on Your Knees”.

Chart performance
"Wish You Were Mine" spent three weeks at number two on the UK Singles Chart, held off by Mark Ronson and Bruno Mars' "Uptown Funk".

Music video
A music video to accompany the release of "Wish You Were Mine" was first released onto YouTube on 25 December 2014 at a total length of three minutes and twenty-five seconds. In the video, George plays a tenant, a bus driver, a policeman and a shopkeeper. The music video was filmed in Teaneck, New Jersey.

Formats and track listings

Charts

Weekly charts

Year-end charts

Certifications

Release history

References

2014 songs
2014 debut singles
Philip George (DJ) songs
Songs written by Stevie Wonder
Songs written by Sylvia Moy
Songs written by Henry Cosby